The 2004–05 season was the 65th season in the history of SD Eibar and the club's 12th consecutive season in the second division of Spanish football. In addition to the domestic league, SD Eibar participated in this season's edition of the Copa del Rey.

Pre-season and friendlies

Competitions

Overall record

Segunda División

League table

Results summary

Results by round

Matches

Copa del Rey

References

SD Eibar seasons
Eibar